Thorella is a genus of shrimp belonging to the family Hippolytidae.

The species of this genus are found in Southeastern Asia and Australia.

Species:
 Thorella cobourgi Bruce, 1982

References

Hippolytidae
Decapod genera